A feature phone (also spelled featurephone) is a type or class of mobile phone that retains the form factor of earlier generations of mobile telephones, typically with press-button based inputs and a small non-touch display. They tend to use an embedded operating system with a small and simple graphical user interface, unlike large and complex mobile operating systems such as Android from Google or iOS from Apple. Their functions are limited compared to smartphones, which integrate the phone with an internet communications device.

Feature phones can provide functions including Internet capabilities and mobile games.

Definition
Prior to the popularity of smartphones, the term 'feature phone' was often used on high-end mobile telephones with assorted functions for retail customers, developed at the advent of 3G networks, which allowed sufficient bandwidth for these capabilities.

Depending on extent of functionality, feature phones may have many of the capabilities of a smartphone, within certain cases.

Contemporary usage
In developed economies, feature phones are primarily specific to niche markets, or have become merely a preference; owing to certain feature combinations not available in other devices, such as affordability, durability, and simplicity.

A well-specified feature phone can be used in industrial environments, and the outdoors, at workplaces that proscribe dedicated cameras, and as an emergency telephone.  Several models are equipped with hardware functions; such as FM radio and flashlight, that prevent the device from becoming useless in the event of a major disaster, or entirely obsolete, if and when 2G network infrastructure is shut down.  Other feature phones are specifically designed for the elderly, and yet others for religious purposes.
In Pakistan and other South Asian countries, many mobile phone outlets use feature phones for balance transfer referred as easyload.

History

Industry trends
In developed economies, fashion and brand loyalty drove sales, as markets had matured and people moved to their second and third phones.  In the United States, technological innovation with regard to expanded functionality was a secondary consideration, as phone designs there centred on miniaturisation.

Existing feature phone operating systems at the time were not designed to handle additional tasks beyond communication and basic functions, and due to the complex bureaucracy and other factors, they never developed a thriving software ecosystem. By contrast, iPhone OS (renamed iOS in 2010) and Android were designed as a robust operating system, embracing third-party software, and having capabilities such as multitasking and graphics capabilities in order to meet future consumer demands.  These platforms also eclipsed the popularity of smartphone platforms historically aimed towards enterprise markets, such as BlackBerry.

There has been an industry shift from feature phones (including low-end smartphones), which rely mainly on volume sales, to high-end flagship smartphones, which also enjoy higher margins, thus manufacturers find high-end smartphones much more lucrative than feature phones.

The shift away from feature phones has forced mobile network operators to increase subsidies of handsets, and the high selling-prices of flagship smartphones have had a negative effect on the mobile network operators, who have seen their earnings before interest, taxes, depreciation, and amortisation (EBITDA) margins drop as they sold more smartphones and fewer feature phones.  To help make up for this, carriers typically use high-end devices to upsell customers onto higher-priced service plans with increased data allotments. Trends have shown that consumers are willing to pay more for smartphones that include newer features and technology, and that smartphones were considered to be more relevant in present-day popular culture than feature phones.

Market share

During the mid-2000s, best-selling feature phones such as the fashionable flip-phone Motorola Razr, multimedia Sony Ericsson W580i, and the LG Black Label Series not only occupied the mid-range pricing in a wireless provider's range, they made up the bulk of retail sales as smartphones from BlackBerry and Palm were still considered a niche category for business use.  Even as late as 2009, smartphone penetration in North America was low.

In 2011, feature phones accounted for 60 percent of the mobile telephones in the United States, and 70 percent of mobile phones sold worldwide.  According to Gartner in Q2 2013, 225 million smartphones were sold worldwide which represented a 46.5 percent gain over the same period in 2012, while 210 million feature phones were sold, which was a decrease of 21 percent year over year, the first time that smartphones have outsold feature phones.  Smartphones accounted for 51.8 percent of mobile phone sales in the second quarter of 2013, resulting in smartphone sales surpassing feature phone sales for the first time.

A survey of 4,001 Canadians by Media Technology Monitor (MTM) in late 2012 suggested about 83 percent of the anglophone population owned a cellphone, up from 80 percent in 2011 and 74 percent in 2010.  About two thirds of the mobile phone owners polled said they had a smartphone, and the other third had feature phones or non-smartphones.  According to MTM, non-smartphone users are more likely to be female, older, have a lower income, live in a small community, and have less education.  The survey found that smartphone owners tend to be male, younger, live in a high-income household with children in the home, and residents of a community of one million or more people.  Students also ranked high among smartphone owners.

Japan
Mobile phones in Japan diverged from those used elsewhere, with carriers and devices often implementing advanced features; such as NTT docomo's i-mode platform for mobile internet in 1999, mobile payments, mobile television, and near field communications; that were not yet widely used, or even adopted, outside of Japan. While smartphones have gained popularity (and implement features introduced on them), many gala-phones are still commonly used, citing preferences for the devices and their durability over smartphones.

Mobile games oriented towards smartphones have seen significant growth and revenue in Japan, even though there were three times fewer smartphone users in the country than in the United States as of 2017.

Platforms
MediaTek developed an embedded operating system named MAUI Runtime Environment which is based on Nucleus RTOS.

See also

References

External links
 

Information appliances
Mobile phones